A borstal or borstal school is a type of juvenile detention centre in India and formerly in the United Kingdom.

Borstal may also refer to:
Borstal Prison, Kent, England, the institution after which the detention system was named
Borstal, Rochester, the village in Kent in which the prison was situated
Borstal Boy, a play by Brendan Behan
Borstal Breakout, a single by Sham 69

See also 

 Boarstall, a village in Buckinghamshire, England